Associazione Calcio Firenze Fiorentina is an Italian professional football club based in Florence, Tuscany. The club was formed on 29 August 1926 by a merger of C.S. Firenze and P.G. Libertas as Associazione Calcio Firenze, and played its first competitive match on 3 October against Pisa. Renamed to Associazione Calcio Fiorentina in 1927, the club won their first piece of silverware, the 1939–40 Coppa Italia, in their first season following their promotion back to Serie A after a one-season stay in the second tier. Their first scudetto (league championship) was won in the 1955–56 season, losing only once in the 34-game season; this was followed by four consecutive second-place finishes. On an international level, following their league win, Fiorentina took part for the first time in a European competition, becoming also the first Italian club to play in a European Cup final (losing 2–0 to Real Madrid). In 1961, Fiorentina became the first Italian club to win a European competition, winning the European Cup Winners' Cup in a two-legged final against Rangers.

Fiorentina's second league title win came in the 1968–69 season, with the winning team, guided by Bruno Pesaola, being dubbed as the Fiorentina Ye-Ye due to their youth. In the years to follow, Fiorentina's performances deteriorated (which included near-relegation finishes), although they did win the 1974–75 Coppa Italia. In the 1980s, the club almost collected their third Serie A title in the 1981–82 season, however they lost it to Juventus in the last game of the season. The decade ended with a runners-up finish in the 1989–90 UEFA Cup, losing to Juventus 3–1 on aggregate.

In the 1992–93 season, after a 55-year spell in the top division, Fiorentina were relegated to Serie B, despite Gabriel Batistuta's 16 league goals. Batistuta spearheaded Fiorentina's return to Serie A the following season and his career with the Florence-based side saw him finish as the club's top scorer for nine consecutive seasons. In the post-promotion years, the club added two further Coppa Italia titles (in the 1995–96 and 2000–01 seasons) and a Supercoppa Italiana win in 1996 to their trophy haul. In the wake of the 2001–02 season, the club entered administration after financial problems. Re-formed initially as Florentia Viola in Serie C2, the fourth level in the Italian league football hierarchy, and then later as ACF Fiorentina, the club returned to the top-tier league in the 2003–04 season.

The club has won Serie A twice, Serie B three times, the Coppa Italia six times, the Supercoppa Italiana once and the UEFA Cup Winner's Cup once. As of the end of the 2019–20 season, Fiorentina has played eighty-three seasons in Serie A, seven in Serie B and one season in Serie D (or equivalent). This list details the club's achievements in major competitions, and the top scorers for each season. Top scorers in bold were also the top scorers within Fiorentina's league division that season.

Key 

 Pld = Matches played
 W = Matches won
 D = Matches drawn
 L = Matches lost
 GF = Goals for
 GA = Goals against
 Pts = Points
 Pos = Final position

 R32 = Round of 32
 R16 = Round of 16
 R1 = Round 1
 R2 = Round 2
 R3 = Round 3
 GS = Group stage
 2GS = Second Group stage
 QF = Quarter-finals
 SF = Semi-finals

 PD = Prima Divisione
 DN = Divisione Nazionale
 Serie A = Serie A
 Serie B = Serie B
 Serie C2 = Serie C2
 CI = Coppa Italia
 SCI = Supercoppa Italiana

 CL = UEFA Champions League 
 EL = UEFA Europa League 
 CWC = UEFA Cup Winners' Cup (1960–1999)
 MC = Mitropa Cup (1927–1992)
 GT = Grasshoppers Trophy (1952–1957)
 ICFC = Inter-Cities Fairs Cup (1955–1971)
 AILC = Anglo-Italian League Cup (1969–1976)

Seasons 
Correct as of the end of the 2021–22 season.

Footnotes

References 

Seasons
Fiorentina